Ras-related protein Rab-3A is a protein that in humans is encoded by the RAB3A gene. It is involved in calcium-triggered exocytosis in neurons.

Interactions 

RAB3A has been shown to interact with:
 RIMS1,
UNC13A,
 RPH3A,  and
 CHM.

References

Further reading